Labeobarbus compiniei is a species of cyprinid fish native to Gabon and the Republic of Congo in Africa.

References

Cyprinid fish of Africa
Taxa named by Henri Émile Sauvage
Fish described in 1879
compiniei